A Swiss roll, jelly roll (United States), roll cake, cream roll, roulade or Swiss log is a type of rolled sponge cake filled with whipped cream, jam, or icing. The origins of the term are unclear; in spite of the name "Swiss roll", the cake is believed to have originated elsewhere in Central Europe, possibly Austria or Slovenia. It appears to have been invented in the nineteenth century, along with Battenberg cake, doughnuts, and Victoria sponge. In the U.S., commercial versions of the cake are sold with the brand names of Ho Hos, Yodels, Swiss Cake Rolls, and others. A type of roll cake called Yule log is traditionally served at Christmas.

The spiral layered shape of the Swiss roll has inspired usage as a descriptive term in other fields, such as the jelly roll fold, a protein fold, the "Swiss roll" metamaterial in optics, and the term jelly roll in science, quilting and other fields.

History 

The earliest published reference for a rolled cake spread with jelly was in the Northern Farmer, a journal published in Utica, New York, in December 1852. Called "To Make Jelly Cake", the recipe describes a modern "jelly roll" and reads: "Bake quick and while hot spread with jelly. Roll carefully, and wrap it in a cloth. When cold cut in slices for the table."

The terminology evolved in America for many years. From 1852 to 1877 such a dessert was called: Jelly Cake (1852), Roll Jelly Cake (1860), Swiss Roll (1872), Jelly Roll (1873), and Rolled Jelly Cake (1876). The name “Jelly Roll” was eventually adopted.

Roll Sandwich or Swiss Pudding appears in the second edition of The complete biscuit and gingerbread baker's assistant in 1854.

The origin of the term "Swiss roll" is unknown. The earliest British reference to a baked item by that name appeared in the Birmingham Journal for Saturday 10 May 1856, page 8, in an advert for Thomas Richards of 71 New Street, Birmingham, where he had '... the patronage bestowed on him for the last fourteen years as the maker of the celebrated Pork Pies, Swiss Rolls, French Pies, German & Genoa Cakes, Grantham and other Ginger Bread for which he defies competition ...' The inference is that Swiss rolls may date to 1842 in England.

A rolled cake appeared on a bill of fare dated 18 June 1871, published in the 1872 book A Voyage from Southampton to Cape Town, in the Union Company’s Mail Steamer “Syria” (London). A recipe for "Swiss roll" also appeared in the US that same year in The American Home Cook Book, published in Detroit, Michigan, in 1872.

Several 1880s to 1890s cookbooks from London, England, used the name Swiss roll exclusively.

The American Pastry Cook, published in Chicago in 1894, presented a basic "Jelly Roll Mixture" then listed variants made from it that included a Swiss roll, Venice roll, Paris roll, chocolate roll, jelly roll cotelettes, and decorated jelly rolls.

Different countries

Germany 
In Germany, they are called Bisquitrolle, which means sponge roll. They can also be named after its filling (e.g. Zitronenrolle – lemon roll, Erdbeerrolle – strawberry roll).

Hong Kong style

Hong Kong 
The origin country of this cake is likely the UK, since Hong Kong was an integral British territory from the 19th century to 1997. Overall, this cake has been sold next to other Chinese pastries well before the existence of Western-style Asian bakeries such as Maxim. There are several popular variations.
 Swiss roll ( or 瑞士卷蛋糕). Cake layer is made of a standard recipe, and a whipped cream filling is standard.
 Chocolate Swiss roll. Cake layer is made of egg in combination with chocolate flavorant. It also has a whipped cream filling.
 Some bakeries offer their own variations, such as layers of egg and chocolate swirl. Other variations include strawberry, coffee or orange fillings.

Overseas Chinatowns 
Most US Chinatown bakeries sell the basic Hong Kong Swiss roll version. It essentially looks and tastes identical to the one sold in Hong Kong. A popular type of Swiss roll in Chinese bakeries in the US is the tiger roll, which has a golden, striped outer appearance derived from its outermost layer (egg yolk). It has traditional white cream inside, and is similar in appearance to tiger bread.

India 
In India, Swiss rolls are called "jam rolls". Kunjus Jam Rolls, since 1931, is a home bakery specializing in pineapple and strawberry jam rolls. It's based in Kochi, in the southern state of Kerala.

Indonesia 
In Indonesia, the Swiss roll cake is called bolu gulung. Most bakeries sell Swiss rolls daily, and they are filled with butter cream, cheese or fruit jam. It is also very common for Swiss rolls to be sold by the slice, but some shops sell by both slice and roll.

Italy 

In Sicily around Caltanissetta (Italy), there is a cake made with chocolate sponge, ricotta, and marzipan called the rollò.

Japan 
In Japan, Swiss rolls are called "roll cake". They are filled with whipped cream and sometimes with fruits like strawberries.

Latin America 
In Colombia, a Swiss roll is called either pionono or brazo de reina ("queen's arm"), and it is filled with dulce de guayaba (guava jam) or arequipe. In Argentina, Uruguay and Peru, it is also called pionono, and it is filled with dulce de leche or manjar blanco (which are a more caramelized and thicker version of condensed milk). In Chile it is called brazo de reina, filled with dulce de leche only, and sprinkled with powdered sugar. It is called arrollado in Costa Rica.

In Puerto Rico and Venezuela it is known as brazo de gitano, but there is a vast array of fillings that include cream, chocolate truffle, dulce de guayaba, dulce de leche manjar blanco, often combined with fruits. In Brazil, it is called rocambole. In Mexico it is called niño envuelto ("wrapped child"). In Ecuador, Guatemala and Uruguay it is known as a brazo gitano ("gypsy's arm").

Southeast Asia 
Varieties produced in Southeast Asia include kaya, pandan, blueberry, strawberry, sweet potato, taro, vanilla, orange, chocolate, raspberry, and even local fruits like durian, cempedak, and mango.

Philippines 

In the Philippines, the most similar traditional pastry is the pionono which is part of the regular offerings of neighborhood bakeries since the Spanish colonial period. It is a rolled variant of the traditional Filipino sponge cakes (mamón) and similarly originally has a very simple filling of sugar and butter (or margarine). Modern versions, however, are commonly frosted and can include a variety of fillings. A very popular variant is the pianono version of the ube cake generally known as "ube rolls". It is flavored with ube (purple yam) and macapuno, giving it a characteristic vivid purple color. Mango pianono or "mango roll", a variant of the mango cake, are also popular and are made with ripe Carabao mangoes and cream. Another notable traditional pianono is the brazo de Mercedes ("arm of Our Lady of Mercy"), composed of a soft meringue body and a custard core. Due to American influence, pianonos are more commonly called "cake rolls" in modern times.

Portugal 
In Portugal, desserts called tortas are commonly found on restaurant menus. Such desserts are not tarts, nor are they similar to German torte. They are simply Swiss rolls with jam filling.

Nordic countries 
In Denmark, Norway, and Sweden the Swiss roll is called roulade, rullade, or rulltårta. An alternative Norwegian name is rullekake or, in some parts of the country, swissrull.

In Sweden and Finland, the Swiss roll is called rulltårta, respectively kääretorttu (both meaning "roll-cake"), and it is commonly served with coffee. The filling often consists of butter cream and strawberry jam. The base of a chocolate version, called drömrulltårta ("dream roll-cake"), is made mostly of potato flour, instead of the typical wheat flour, and it is filled with butter cream. More elaborate versions of the Swiss roll can be found in bakeries, with, for example, whipped cream and a crushed banana rolled in the middle, or with a thin marzipan coating that resembles a birch log.

Spain 

In Spain, the dessert is called brazo de gitano (literally translated as "gypsy's arm") and is commonly filled with cream, jam (such as peach or apricot), powdered cocoa and nuts.

Switzerland
Despite its name, the Swiss roll appears not to have originated in Switzerland. Swiss rolls are called Biskuitroulade or Roulade in Swiss Standard German, gâteau roulé or roulade in French, rotolo or biscotto arrotolato in Italian and rullada in Rumantsch.

United Kingdom
In the UK, Swiss rolls are popular at teatime or as a dessert. A variety of Swiss rolls are sold in supermarkets in the United Kingdom, such as chocolate, lemon or jam (the last being the most popular). Jam Swiss rolls will be filled with jam and sometimes cream, with a sugar or chocolate-drizzled outer coating. Jam roly-poly is a similar dessert, but made as a suet pudding rather than a cake, filled with jam and served hot with custard.

"Caterpillar cakes" are Swiss rolls decorated to look like caterpillars, one popular commercial example being Marks and Spencer's Colin the Caterpillar.

United States

American pastry chefs and menus in fine dining restaurants often use the French term roulade. The chocolate Swiss roll, sometimes called a "chocolate log", is a popular cake or dessert. Produced by many commercial bakeries, common brands include Ho Hos and Yodels, which are smaller-sized rolls for individual consumption. When the filling is ice cream, it is commonly referred to as an "ice cream cake roll", and although they can vary, these often consist of chocolate cake with vanilla ice cream.

See also 
 
 Bûche de Noël
 Cinnamon roll
 List of cakes
 List of desserts

References 

French cakes
German cakes
Italian cakes
Sponge cakes
Stuffed desserts
American cakes
Foods with jam
British cakes